Alex Gruber (born 21 December 1992) is an Italian luger who has competed since 2004. A natural track luger, he won a silver medal in the mixed team event at the FIL European Luge Natural Track Championships 2010 in St. Sebastian. Austria.

References

External links

 

1992 births
Living people
Italian lugers
Italian male lugers
People from Villanders
Sportspeople from Südtirol